Xianlinhu station, is a station on Line 4 of the Nanjing Metro and planned interchange station with the future Line S5. It is the eastern terminus of Line 4, which opened on January 18, 2017 alongside seventeen other stations. Located on the eastern edge of Nanjing's suburban Qixia District, it the only elevated station among the Phase I stations, and is located at the intersection of Weidi Road and Guangzhi Road.

Xianlinhu Station is named after the nearby Xianlin Lake Park.

References

Railway stations in Jiangsu
Railway stations in China opened in 2017
Nanjing Metro stations